Miracavira is a genus of moths of the family Noctuidae. The genus was erected by John G. Franclemont in 1937.

Species
 Miracavira annadora (Dyar, 1913)
 Miracavira brillians (Barnes, 1901)
 Miracavira sylvia (Dyar, 1913)

References

Amphipyrinae